Tuur Rommens (born 26 March 2003) is a Belgian professional footballer who plays for Jong Genk.

Early life 
Born and raised in Oud-Turnhout, in the Flemish province of Antwerp, Rommens joined Genk's academy from Westerlo when he was nine.

Club career 
Tuur Rommens was a regular with Genk under-19s, since the 2019–20 Youth League, eventually captaining his side during the 2021–22 edition, as well as the reserve team for that season.

Having signed his first professional contract with Genk in February 2020, Rommens signed an extectention at the end of April 2021, until mid-2024.

The young left-back made his first team debut on the 27 October 2021 coming on as a halftime substitute for Gerardo Arteaga, during the 6–0 away cup win against Sint-Eloois-Winkel. He made his league debut for KRC Genk on the 16 December 2021, replacing Simen Juklerød at the end of a 4–2 home win against Sporting Charleroi.

International career 
Already a Belgium under-17 international, he played with the under-19 in 2021, scoring his first goal with the team on the 10 November 2021, during a Euro qualifier game against Azerbaijan, having become a regular starter for the team at left-back, before eventually captaining the Belgian side during the qualifying game against Javi Serrano's Spain.

References

External links

RTL profile

2003 births
People from Oud-Turnhout
Footballers from Antwerp Province
Living people
Belgian footballers
Belgium youth international footballers
Association football defenders
K.R.C. Genk players
Jong Genk players
Belgian Pro League players
Challenger Pro League players